Hamlin Township may refer to:

 Hamlin Township, Audubon County, Iowa
 Hamlin Township, Brown County, Kansas
 Hamlin Township, Eaton County, Michigan
 Hamlin Township, Mason County, Michigan
 Hamlin Township, Lac qui Parle County, Minnesota
 Hamlin Township, Nelson County, North Dakota, in Nelson County, North Dakota
 Hamlin Township, McKean County, Pennsylvania
 Hamlin Township, Hamlin County, South Dakota, in Hamlin County, South Dakota

Township name disambiguation pages